Eng Family Benevolent Association, also referred to as Eng Suey Sun Association, was founded by members of the Eng (伍) clan, who emigrated from China to various parts of the world while seeking out a better life (References 1).  Note that the Chinese surname 伍 is transliterated to a number of forms. Examples are: Wu, Ng, Eng, Ing, or Ang.

Eng Family Associations around the world are often named in honor of the common ancestor of the Eng (Wu) Clan from Suzhou China, Wu Zixu (伍子胥), referring to a shrine erected for him on a mountain, 胥山, with Toishanese transliteration, Eng Suey Sun (Reference 2). Today, there are a number of Eng Family Benevolent Associations or fraternal societies all over the world. They are located in Taishan Guangdong and Hong Kong, People's Republic of China; Jakarta and Medan, Indonesia; Kuala Lumpur and Penang, Malaysia; Yangon, Myanmar; Manila, Philippines; Calgary, Ottawa, Toronto, and Vancouver, Canada; and Taipei, Taiwan.

In the United States, the National Eng Family Benevolent Association has its business office at 53 Waverly Place, San Francisco, California, 94108.

Branches
The Eng Suey Sun Association has additional branches in North America, including in:
 Boston, Massachusetts - Located at 22 Tyler Street (617) 482-2163 (Reference 4)
 Chicago, Illinois - Located at 245 W Alexander Street (312) 326-0221
 Los Angeles, California - Located at 418 Cottage Home Street (323) 227-8265
 New York, New York - Located at 5 Mott Street 212-267-6556
 San Francisco, California - Located at 53 Waverly Pl 415-362-6732
 Seattle, Washington - Located at 815 S Weller Street 206-624-2796
 Toronto, Ontario - Located at 14 D'Arcy Street 416-977-3991 
 Vancouver, BC - Located at 389½ E. Hastings Street 604-681-8866

References
1. World Eng Family Benevolent Association Official Home Page at http://www.engfamily.org/

Chinese-American organizations
Chinese diaspora
Organizations based in San Francisco
Family associations
Chinatown, San Francisco
Chinatown, Boston
Chinatown, Los Angeles